KHSL-TV (channel 12) is a television station licensed to Chico, California, United States, serving the Chico–Redding market as an affiliate of CBS and The CW Plus. It is owned by Allen Media Broadcasting, which provides certain services to dual NBC/Telemundo affiliate KNVN (channel 24, also licensed to Chico) under a shared services agreement (SSA) with Maxair Media. Both stations share studios at the McClung Broadcast Center on the corner of Eaton and Silverbell Road on the northwest side of Chico, while KHSL's transmitter is located along Cohasset Road in rural Butte County northwest of Paradise, California.

History

KHSL-TV came on air in 1953 and was established by the McClung family's Golden Empire Broadcasting Company along with KHSL-AM 1290. The call letters are in honor of Harry Smithson and Sidney Lewis, who founded KHSL-AM in 1935. They sold the station to Hugh and Ruth "Mickey" McClung a year later. During the same year, a control panel fire broke out at the KHSL studio. The station immediately went off the air for two hours before telecasting the start of Game 2 of the 1954 World Series.

In October 1994, it was sold to United Communications Corporation. On September 14, 1998, KHSL-TV was purchased by Catamount Broadcasting.

From its start, KHSL-TV was an affiliate of CBS. When KRCR-TV entered the Chico–Redding market as an NBC affiliate, the two stations occasionally cherry-picked ABC programming since no third commercial station had yet existed. In 1978, KRCR-TV switched to ABC. KHSL-TV then picked up some NBC programming such as The Tonight Show Starring Johnny Carson. However, the station and signal were forced to switch to KRON-TV in San Francisco whenever NBC programming aired. This required the awkward masking of KRON's IDs and commercials. Eventually, when KCPM (now KNVN) launched and took the NBC affiliation, the sharing of a third network was no longer necessary in the Chico–Redding market. However, there may have been at least one attempt in the mid-1960s to bring a potential ABC-affiliated third commercial station to the area. The third station never materialized.

From 1956 to 1960, KHSL-TV aired a half-hour program on Sunday evenings called There is a Telling. The program explored the folklore and history of northern California. Chico State College produced the program with the aid of students. It is perhaps best remembered for its ballad theme song performed by Tom Lee. During the early 1960s, actor Richard Kiel also worked at Channel 12 as the title character/host on The Paul Bunyan Show, which is shown on YouTube.

From 1956 to 1995, KHSL aired the half-hour music program, The Moriss Taylor Show. The show was hosted by Moriss Taylor and featured several musicians such as Charlie Robinson, Yvonne Haygood, Bill Teague, Mark Alstad, and Rosie Mello. Reruns aired until 1997, two years after Catamount Broadcasting purchased KHSL-TV. The show aired on KRVU-LD on Saturday mornings beginning at 10 a.m. from 1997 until 2015 when that station canceled the show after it was sold to Bonten Media Group, owners of chief rival KRCR-TV.

Merger with KNVN
On August 10, 1998, when KCPM changed its callsign to KNVN, Grapevine Communications sold the station because of its large debt and likely bankruptcy. To avoid possibly putting KNVN off the air, the nearly bankrupt station signed a shared service agreement with KHSL, eventually leading to the controversial consolidation of the news departments. The ratings of the newscasts have always lagged far behind KHSL and KRCR. The takeover led to a slight rise in ratings and KHSL's ratings slightly declined. Soon after, the ratings of both stations plummeted once the newscasts merged. Today's newscasts have slightly increased ratings with six newscasts each weekday and two each day on weekends, but both KHSL and KNVN remain behind KRCR-TV and, to a lesser extent, KCVU, placing fourth and third respectively. The combined operation's ratings are hampered in part because most locations in the southern portion of the viewing area can receive many of the larger stations from Sacramento, including KCRA or KOVR. Both of those stations are also available on Comcast Cable.

Sale to GOCOM
On February 6, 2013, it was announced that KHSL would be sold to GOCOM Media, LLC. Concurrently, sister station KNVN was sold by Evans Broadcasting to K4 Media Holdings, LLC. The FCC approved the sale on April 19, 2013; it was consummated on May 6. On July 14, 2015, GOCOM announced that it would sell KHSL-TV to Heartland Media (which also owns Oregon television stations KDRV in Medford and KEZI in Eugene), through its USA Television Holdings joint venture with MSouth Equity Partners, for $40 million; concurrently, K4 Media Holdings would sell KNVN to Maxair Media, with KHSL providing services to KNVN and selling up to 15 percent of channel 24's advertising time. The sale was completed on December 1.

Sale to Heartland Media
On July 15, 2015, the announcement was made that Heartland Media, owned by Robert Prather, would be purchasing the station from Gocom and entering a local marketing agreement with Maxair-owned KNVN, which was already operated out of the same facility.

Sale to Entertainment Studios
On October 1, 2019, it was announced that media mogul Byron Allen's Entertainment Studios would be purchasing 11 of Heartland Media's stations across nine markets for $290 million. Former owner Robert Prather agreed to continue management of the stations at least through the duration of the sale's pending. The sale was completed on February 11, 2020. Allen's other holdings include The Weather Channel and 21 regional sports networks.

Chico–Redding CW
Starting in September 2006, the DT2 subcarrier added programming from The CW Television Network. This coincided with the company's acquisition of KIWB from Bluestone Television in July 2006. It has its own 10:00 newscast titled CW Action News at Ten. It broadcasts on cable channel 10 on both Comcast and Charter systems. It is also available on Dish Network channel 43 and on DirecTV channel 10. It gets most of its programming from The CW Plus, but airs Maury at noon and Dr. Phil at 1 p.m.

News operation

One of the station's first newscasts was Valley Headline News, which is 1959 was broadcast on Tuesdays, Wednesdays and Thursdays at 7:00 p.m. local time. W. E. Thomas was the news director.

From the 1970s to the late 2000s, the station produced a local public affairs program called Agenda 12 (later known as just Agenda) which featured various hosts.

During the 1990s, news anchor Bruce Lang hosted a half-hour news and information program called Sunday Evening, which was similar to CBS News Sunday Morning. The program aired after the Sunday edition of the CBS Evening News and before 60 Minutes.

Your Show Live was a locally produced interview program that aired from 2002 to 2004 as a taped rebroadcast of its live program on KNVN. As of 2018, there are seven newscasts produced throughout the day. Action News Now at 5 and 6 (formerly called "Wake Up!") is the station's morning news programming that airs from 5 to 7 a.m. Action News Now at Noon provides midday coverage, recapping and following up on early morning developments and often uniquely featuring in-studio guests from the surrounding community. Starting in 2017, Action News Now First At 4 was added exclusively to KNVN, beginning the station's evening coverage. The evening news is rounded out with Action News Now at 5, and Action News Now at 6. The late night newscasts include the CW Action News Now at 10 and Action News Now at 11 – the former being the only newscast not broadcast on either KHSL or KNVN. The morning newscasts as well as 4 and 5 p.m. shows are all one-hour productions while all other news programming is thirty minutes. Weekend newscasts are all half-hour shows at 6 and 11 p.m. on Saturdays, as well as 5, 6, and 11 p.m. on Sundays.

A thirty-minute Spanish-language newscast is also produced for Telemundo, called Accíon Noticiero Telemundo at 6 and 11 p.m. Monday through Friday.

Notable former on-air staff
 Louisa Hodge (NCN Wake Up! host) (2003–2005, now at KCBS-2/KCAL-9, Los Angeles)
 Stan Statham (news anchor) (1960s-1970s, former California state assemblyman, now president of the California Broadcasters Association)
 Moriss Taylor (host of The Moriss Taylor Show) (1956-1995, retired in 2013, died in 2018)
 Anthony Watts (chief meteorologist) (1987–2002, 2004, now at KPAY radio in Chico and returned as weekend weather anchor in 2015)

Technical information

Subchannels
The stations' digital signals are multiplexed:

Analog-to-digital conversion
KHSL-TV became digital-only on December 22, 2008. The station shut down its analog signal, over VHF channel 12, on January 1, 2009. The station's digital signal remained on its pre-transition UHF channel 43. Through the use of PSIP, digital television receivers display the station's virtual channel as its former VHF analog channel 12.

Early switchover
KHSL replaced normal programming with digital TV information on analog channel 12, and eventually turned it off on January 1, 2009. KHSL's 235 kW,  digital tower doubled its power to nearly 500 kW on February 17, 2009.

Loss in over-the-air coverage
According to KHSL's engineering department, KHSL chose not return to VHF channel 12 as the digital transmission has much poorer results than UHF channels. There was still a substantial loss in over-the-air (OTA) coverage. There has been criticized because a VHF signal better covers the terrain of the rural, mountainous viewing area in local communities and could have actually gained coverage if the digital transmitter used the analog tower. However, results by most stations in the U.S. show a loss of coverage with a VHF signal, but the Chico–Redding area is unique in the fact that the valley is suited better for UHF (VHF is notorious for impulse noise) while the foothills and mountains are better suited for VHF (UHF does not travel the natural curve of the Earth well); but KHSL had to take a loss of approximately 50,000 potential viewers since it cannot satisfy both types of terrain at the same time, less than it would have on VHF 12 but still much worse than the other stations in the area which saw little or no loss in coverage. However, it covers 537,000 people which is still second to KCVU—which now covers 550,000 people and pulls ahead of KRCR, KIXE, and KNVN, which better cover the core Chico–Redding area, only covering 400,000 people each. Many rural cable systems use Dish Network to feed their systems now since they have now lost OTA coverage. Viewers in northern areas of Sacramento can now occasionally receive a clear KHSL signal, when before they could only get a snowy image at best. To make up for the reception problem in Redding, KHSL has launched a digital fill-in translator from South Fork Mountain on channel 36. In 2018, the translator relocated to channel 18.

Translators

1: K31PS-D formerly operated on channel 35 under the call sign K35LB-D until 2019.
2: K19GA-D formerly operated on analog channel 59 under the call sign K59ET until 2008.
3: K35JX-D formerly operated on analog channel 69 under the call sign K69EN until 1990; it then operated on analog channel 54 under the call sign K45EE until 2010, when it converted to digital as K35JX-D.

See also
KHSL-FM

References

External links

Entertainment Studios
1953 establishments in California
CBS network affiliates
Ion Television affiliates
Television channels and stations established in 1953
HSL-TV